Groulx is a provincial electoral district in the Laurentides region of Quebec, Canada, that elects members to the National Assembly of Quebec. It notably includes the city of Boisbriand as well as a few other small cities.

It was created for the 1981 election from a part of the Terrebonne electoral district.

In the change from the 2001 to the 2011 electoral map, it gained a small part of the city of Blainville from the Blainville electoral district; it did not previously include any part of that city.

In the change from the 2011 to 2017 electoral map, the riding will lose the Saint-Rédempteur neighbourhood of Blainville to the riding of Blainville.

From its creation in 1981 until 2007, Groulx was a bellwether riding always sending a member from the governing party to the National Assembly. Since the ADQ breakthrough in the suburbs of Montreal in 2007, the riding has been targeted by all major parties and is part of a collection of ridings that determine Quebec elections. The riding is overwhelmingly francophone and white, and has a strong nationalist undercurrent, making it a battleground riding between the Parti Quebecois, ADQ/CAQ, and the Quebec Liberals.

In 2014, the PQ nominated Martine Desjardins, former leader of the FEUQ during the 2012 student strike. She was seen as a star candidate. While the PQ began the campaign with a strong lead among francophones and heavily targeted CAQ-held ridings such as Groulx, the fall of the PQ and rise of the CAQ during the last two weeks of the campaign kept this riding in the hands of the CAQ, albeit in a tight 3-way split with no candidate receiving more than 31% of the vote.

Members of the National Assembly

Election results

^ Change is from redistributed results. CAQ change is from ADQ.

* Result compared to UFP

References

External links
Information
 Elections Quebec

Election results
 Election results (National Assembly)
 Election results (QuébecPolitique)

Maps
 2011 map (PDF)
 2001 map (Flash)
2001–2011 changes (Flash)
1992–2001 changes (Flash)
 Electoral map of Laurentides region
 Quebec electoral map, 2011

Quebec provincial electoral districts
Boisbriand
Blainville, Quebec
Sainte-Thérèse, Quebec